The Fairchild Dornier 428JET was a program undertaken by American company Fairchild Dornier to develop a 44-seat regional jet aircraft. The program  was part of a broader attempt by the company to develop a family of regional jets, comprising the 328JET, 428JET, and the 728 series. This family of aircraft was designed to compete with the Bombardier CRJ and Embraer ERJ/Embraer E-Jets families. The aircraft was announced on May 19, 1998. It was cancelled in August 2000.

Design and development
The 428JET would have been a stretched version of the 328JET, seating 44 in comparison to the 328JET's 34. Additionally, the two aircraft would have shared the same type rating. Plans were for the 428JET to be assembled in Israel by Israel Aerospace Industries. In the end, changing market conditions made a 44-seat airplane like the 428JET inferior to 50 seat aircraft, which have nearly the same operating and procurement costs yet higher profits due to having more seats. This caused the company to cancel the 428JET on August 8, 2000.

Orders
At the time of cancellation, the aircraft had 39 firm orders with another 88 options (55 of these options could be taken on either the 328JET or 428JET). Companies ordering the airplane were Atlantic Coast Airlines (30), Skyway Airlines (5), and Air Alps Aviation (4), Air One CityLiner (2).

Specifications

See also

References

Abandoned civil aircraft projects
428
428JET
Twinjets
High-wing aircraft
T-tail aircraft

de:Dornier 428JET